A county line is the border between two counties.

County lines may also refer to:

 County lines (drug trafficking), a form of drug trafficking in the United Kingdom

County Line may also refer to:
 County Line Branch, a stream in Pennsylvania, United States
 County Line (album), by High Valley
 County Line (song)
 County Line (film)
 County Line, Alabama
 County Line, Arkansas
 County Line, Wisconsin
 County Line Baptist Church, Dudleyville, Alabama, United States
 County Line High School, Branch, Alabama, United States
 County Line station (disambiguation), stations of the name
 El Cerrito, Contra Costa County, California, formerly County Line

See also 
 County Line Bridge (disambiguation)